Cheryl Francis Harrington is an American actress. She is best known for playing Mambo Garcelle "Haiti Lady" DuPris on the television series The PJs. She also played a cameo role as Phoebe Buffay's interviewer in the American television sitcom Friends in the fourth episode of the fourth season "The One with the Ballroom Dancing".

Credits

Film

Theatre (selected)

References

External links

Year of birth missing (living people)
Living people
American actors of Jamaican descent
American people of Trinidad and Tobago descent
American television actresses
American voice actresses
20th-century American actresses
21st-century American actresses